The voiceless or more precisely tenuis bilabial click is a click consonant found in some languages of southern Africa.

Features

Features of the tenuis bilabial click:

Occurrence
Tenuis bilabial clicks are only known to occur in the Tuu and Kx'a families of southern Africa.

Notes

Bilabial consonants
Click consonants
Oral consonants
Tenuis consonants